Isabella of Urgel (Aragonese: Isabel d'Urchel; died 1071) was Queen of Aragon; the only daughter of Ermengol III, Count of Urgell by his first wife Adelaide of Besalú.

Isabella is mentioned in her brother Ermengol IV's testament.

Isabella married in 1065 King Sancho Ramírez; by this marriage, Isabella was Queen of Aragon. The couple had one son, Peter I, Sancho's successor who left no surviving children. The couple divorced in 1070, and both remarried. Isabella may have become the second wife of William I, Count of Cerdanya in 1071.

References

1071 deaths
Aragonese queen consorts
House of Aragon
Year of birth missing
11th-century people from the Kingdom of Aragon
11th-century Spanish women